The 2021 Men's European Volleyball League was the 17th edition of the annual Men's European Volleyball League, which featured men's national volleyball teams from 20 European countries.

The tournament had two divisions: the Golden League, which featured twelve teams, and the Silver League with eight teams.

Pools composition
Teams were seeded following the serpentine system according to their European Ranking for national teams as of January 2020. Rankings are shown in brackets. Netherlands withdrew on 26 April after it was chosen by the FIVB to replace China in the FIVB Volleyball Men's Nations League leaving Pool B with three teams.

Golden league

Silver league

Pool standing procedure
 Total number of victories (matches won, matches lost)
 In the event of a tie, the following first tiebreaker will apply: The teams will be ranked by the most point gained per match as follows:
Match won 3–0 or 3–1: 3 points for the winner, 0 points for the loser
Match won 3–2: 2 points for the winner, 1 point for the loser
Match forfeited: 3 points for the winner, 0 points (0–25, 0–25, 0–25) for the loser
 If teams are still tied after examining the number of victories and points gained, then the FIVB will examine the results in order to break the tie in the following order:
Set quotient: if two or more teams are tied on the number of points gained, they will be ranked by the quotient resulting from the division of the number of all set won by the number of all sets lost.
Points quotient: if the tie persists based on the set quotient, the teams will be ranked by the quotient resulting from the division of all points scored by the total of points lost during all sets.
If the tie persists based on the point quotient, the tie will be broken based on the team that won the match of the Round Robin Phase between the tied teams. When the tie in point quotient is between three or more teams, these teams ranked taking into consideration only the matches involving the teams in question.

League round
All times are local.

Golden league

Pool A

|}

|}

Pool B 

|}

|}

Pool C

|}

|}

Silver league

Pool A

|}

|}

Pool B

|}

|}

Final round
All times are Central European Summer Time (UTC+02:00).

Silver League
Venue:  Strumica Park, Strumica, North Macedonia

Semifinals

|}

3rd place

|}

Final

|}

Golden League
Venue:  SC Lange Munte, Kortrijk, Belgium

Semifinals

|}

3rd place

|}

Final

|}

Final standing

Awards 
Most Valuable Player
 Adis Lagumdzija

See also
2021 Women's European Volleyball League

References

External links
Official website of the Golden League
Official website of the Silver League

Europe
European Volleyball League
European Volleyball League
European Volleyball League
European Volleyball League